Eddy Township is a township in Clearwater County, Minnesota, United States. The population was 322 at the 2000 census.

Eddy Township was named for Frank Eddy, a Minnesota congressman.

Geography

Demographics
As of the census of 2000, there were 322 people, 133 households, and 94 families residing in the township.  The population density was 9.2 people per square mile (3.6/km2).  There were 151 housing units at an average density of 4.3/sq mi (1.7/km2).  The racial makeup of the township was 97.83% White, 0.62% African American, 0.62% Native American, 0.62% Asian, 0.31% from other races. Hispanic or Latino of any race were 0.62% of the population.

There were 133 households, out of which 27.8% had children under the age of 18 living with them, 64.7% were married couples living together, 5.3% had a female householder with no husband present, and 28.6% were non-families. 27.8% of all households were made up of individuals, and 12.8% had someone living alone who was 65 years of age or older.  The average household size was 2.42 and the average family size was 2.97.

In the township the population was spread out, with 24.8% under the age of 18, 5.3% from 18 to 24, 22.7% from 25 to 44, 27.3% from 45 to 64, and 19.9% who were 65 years of age or older.  The median age was 43 years. For every 100 females, there were 103.8 males.  For every 100 females age 18 and over, there were 101.7 males.

The median income for a household in the township was $30,357, and the median income for a family was $44,000. Males had a median income of $22,500 versus $23,750 for females. The per capita income for the township was $20,293.  About 6.0% of families and 7.3% of the population were below the poverty line, including 1.1% of those under age 18 and 23.6% of those age 65 or over.

References

Townships in Clearwater County, Minnesota
Townships in Minnesota